Hornet is a family twister roller coaster located at Wonderland Park in Amarillo, Texas. It was previously enclosed and located at Six Flags AstroWorld, as well as at Boblo Island Amusement Park.

History
The ride originally debuted at Boblo Island Amusement Park as Nightmare. When that park closed, it was relocated to Six Flags AstroWorld and renamed Mayan Mindbender. The Mayan Mindbender was an indoor ride themed to a pyramid structure. After AstroWorld closed at the end of the 2005 season, the ride moved again to Wonderland Park in Amarillo, Texas, where it reopened in 2009, as Hornet.

References

External links
 Hornet official site
 Wonderland Park official site

Roller coasters operated by Six Flags
Six Flags AstroWorld
Roller coasters in Texas